Old Troy, Texas, known as Troy, Texas, for most of its existence and the location of the Elm Creek Post Office, is a ghost town in Bell County, Texas, about two miles north of the current city of Troy, Texas.  It was one of the places settled in the 1850s, with a post office named Elm Creek established in 1854.

When the Missouri, Kansas and Texas Railroad came through in 1882, it built its route south of the town and established a station at what is now Troy, Texas.  Many of the residents resisted the rise of New Troy and the school at Old Troy still had 60 students in 1903.  It totally vanished by the late 1920s.

References
Handbook of Texas online article on Old Troy

Populated places established in 1854
Geography of Bell County, Texas
Ghost towns in Central Texas
1854 establishments in Texas